The 2004 Atlantic 10 Conference Baseball Championship was held from May 26 through 30 at Dodd Stadium in Norwich, Connecticut. It featured the top two regular-season finishers of each six-team division, plus the next two best finishers. Fourth-seeded St. Bonaventure defeated Rhode Island in the title game to win the tournament for the first time, earning the Atlantic 10's automatic bid to the 2004 NCAA Tournament.

Seeding and format 
The league's top six teams, based on winning percentage in the 24-game regular season schedule, qualified for the field. The top two teams in each division qualified for the tournament automatically; the two division winners, Rhode Island in the East and George Washington in the West, received the top two seeds and byes through to the second round of the double elimination tournament.

Bracket

All-Tournament Team 
The following players were named to the All-Tournament Team. St. Bonaventure's Brian Pellegrini, one of three Bonnies selected, was named Most Outstanding Player.

Richmond's Thomas Martin (2002) and Bobby LeNoir (2003) were second-time selections.

References 

Tournament
Atlantic 10 Conference Baseball Tournament
Atlantic 10 Conference baseball tournament
Atlantic 10 Conference baseball tournament
College baseball tournaments in Connecticut